Tobie Marier Robitaille is a Canadian cinematographer. He is most noted for the documentary film Big Giant Wave (Comme une vague), for which he and Josée Deshaies won the Prix Iris for Best Cinematography in a Documentary at the 24th Quebec Cinema Awards in 2022.

He has also received two prior Prix Iris nominationms for Best Cinematography, at the 19th Quebec Cinema Awards in 2017 for Nitro Rush and at the 23rd Quebec Cinema Awards in 2021 for Night of the Kings (La nuit des rois).

His other credits have included the films Origami, Junior Majeur, Threesome (Le trip à trois) and Our Own (Les Nôtres).

References

External links

Canadian cinematographers
French Quebecers
Living people
Year of birth missing (living people)